USS Advance (YT-28) was an  acquired by the United States Navy for the task of patrolling American coastal waters during the First World War.

In June or July 1918, the fourth vessel to be named Advance (Id. No. 3057) by the Navy—a tug built in 1912 at Solomons Island, Maryland, by M. M. Davis—was acquired by the Navy from A. J. Taylor & Bros., Washington, D.C., and was placed in commission on 27 July 1918.

World War I service as a patrol craft
For the duration of World War I, she served as a patrol vessel assigned to the 5th Naval District and was based at Norfolk, Virginia. Following the end of hostilities, she became a harbor tug at Norfolk and remained so employed for the rest of her Navy career.

Redesignated as a tugboat
She was designated YT-28 on 17 July 1920 when the Navy adopted the alphanumeric system of hull designations. Advance remained active at Norfolk until 7 June 1933, when she was decommissioned and berthed at the Philadelphia Navy Yard.

Decommissioning
Her name was struck from the Navy Directory on 12 December 1933; and she was sold to Mr. Martin J. Carroll, Brooklyn, New York, on 14 June 1934.

References

External links
 USS Advance
 NavSource Online: Section Patrol Craft Photo Archive – YT-28 – ex-Advance (ID 3057)

Tugs of the United States Navy
Ships built in Solomons, Maryland
Patrol vessels of the United States Navy
Patrol vessels of the United States
1912 ships
World War I patrol vessels of the United States